Lahepera is a small farming village in Peipsiääre Parish, Tartu County in eastern Estonia.

References

External links
Weather in Lahepera

Villages in Tartu County